Robinstown, in the townland of Balbradagh, is a village in County Meath, Ireland. 

As of the 2016 census, the village (known for census purposes as Balbradagh) had a population of 374 people. The local national (primary) school, Robinstown National School, had an enrollment of over 180 pupils as of 2014. 

Robinstown Roman Catholic church (built ) is in the parish of Dunderry, and is listed on the Record of Protected Structures for County Meath. Archaeological sites in the area include a ringfort site to the west of the village in Balbradagh townland.

References

Towns and villages in County Meath